Malleus Maleficarum (stylized as Mallevs Maleficarvm) is the debut studio album by the Dutch death metal band Pestilence, released in 1988. Although the sound of this album is technically death metal, its direction is notably different from the band's subsequent work, leaning more towards the thrash metal genre with punk influences, known as crossover thrash. This is the only Pestilence album to include guitarist Randy Meinhard, who was replaced by Patrick Uterwijk prior to the making of their next album Consuming Impulse (1989).

Track listing

Bonus tracks
The album was re-issued in 1998 on Displeased Records with two earlier demos as bonus tracks:

Demo 1 Dysentery 87
 "Against the Innocent"
 "Delirical Life"
 "Traitor's Gate"
 "Throne of Death"

Demo 2 Penance 88
 "Into Hades (Intro)"
 "Before the Penance"
 "Affectation"
 "Fight the Plague"

Credits
 Martin van Drunen - vocals
 Patrick Mameli - guitar, bass
 Randy Meinhard - guitar
 Marco Foddis - drums
 Kalle Trapp - synthesizer on Osculum Infame; producer

References

Pestilence (band) albums
1988 debut albums
Roadrunner Records albums